Coopers Hall may refer to:
 Coopers Hall Winery and Taproom, Portland, Oregon, U.S.
 Coopers' Hall, the former foyer for the Bristol Old Vic

See also
 Cooper Hall